The 1820 United States presidential election was the ninth quadrennial presidential election. It was held from Wednesday, November 1, to Wednesday, December 6, 1820. Taking place at the height of the Era of Good Feelings, the election saw incumbent Democratic-Republican President James Monroe win re-election without a major opponent. It was the third and the most recent United States presidential election in which a presidential candidate ran effectively unopposed. As of 2022, this is the most recent presidential election where an incumbent president was re-elected who was neither a Democrat nor a Republican, before the Democratic-Republican party split into separate parties.

Monroe and Vice President Daniel D. Tompkins faced no opposition from other Democratic-Republicans in their quest for a second term. The Federalist Party had fielded a presidential candidate in each election since 1796, but the party's already-waning popularity had declined further following the War of 1812. Although able to field a nominee for vice president, the Federalists could not put forward a presidential candidate, leaving Monroe without organized opposition.

Monroe won every state and received all but one of the electoral votes. Secretary of State John Quincy Adams received the only other electoral vote, which came from faithless elector William Plumer. Nine different Federalists received electoral votes for vice president, but Tompkins won re-election by a large margin. No other post-Twelfth Amendment presidential candidate has matched Monroe's share of the electoral vote. Monroe and George Washington remain the only presidential candidates to run without any major opposition. Monroe's victory was the last of six straight victories by Virginians in presidential elections (Jefferson twice, Madison twice, and Monroe twice). This was the last election in which an incumbent ticket got reelected until the ticket of Woodrow Wilson and Thomas R. Marshall got reelected in 1916, 96 years later.

Background 
Despite the continuation of single party politics (known in this case as the Era of Good Feelings), serious issues emerged during the election in 1820. The nation had endured a widespread depression following the Panic of 1819 and momentous disagreement about the extension of slavery into the territories was taking center stage. Nevertheless, James Monroe faced no opposition party or candidate in his re-election bid, although he did not receive  all of the electoral votes (see below).

Massachusetts was entitled to 22 electoral votes in 1816, but cast only 15 in 1820 by reason of the Missouri Compromise of 1820, which made the region of Maine, long part of Massachusetts, a free state to balance the pending admission of slave state Missouri. In addition, Pennsylvania, Tennessee and Mississippi also cast one fewer electoral vote than they were entitled to, as one elector from each state died before the electoral meeting. Consequently, this meant that Mississippi cast only two votes, when any state is always entitled to a minimum of three. This is one of only three times a state or district has cast under the minimum of three electoral votes, the others being Nevada in 1864 and the District of Columbia in 2000. In the case of the former, an elector was snowbound and there was no law to replace him (Nevada had only become a state that year). In that of the latter, a faithless elector abstained from voting.

Alabama, Illinois, Maine, Mississippi and Missouri participated in their first presidential election in 1820, Missouri with controversy since it was not yet officially a state (see below). No new states would participate in American presidential elections until 1836, after the admission to the Union of Arkansas in 1836 and Michigan in 1837 (after the main voting, but before the counting of the electoral vote in Congress).

Nominations

Democratic-Republican Party nomination 

Only fifty of the one hundred ninety-one Democratic-Republican members of the United States Congress attended the nominating caucus and they unanimously voted to not make a nomination as it would be unnecessary to do so. Monroe and Tompkins appeared on the ballot with the support of the Democratic-Republican Party despite not being formally nominated.

General election

Campaign 
Effectively there was no campaign, since there was no serious opposition to Monroe and Tompkins.

Disputes 

On March 9, 1820, Congress had passed a law directing Missouri to hold a convention to form a constitution and a state government. This law stated that "the said state, when formed, shall be admitted into the Union, upon an equal footing with the original states, in all respects whatsoever." However, when Congress reconvened in November 1820, the admission of Missouri became an issue of contention. Proponents claimed that Missouri had fulfilled the conditions of the law and therefore was a state; detractors contended that certain provisions of the Missouri Constitution violated the United States Constitution.

By the time Congress was due to meet to count the electoral votes from the election, this dispute had lasted over two months. The counting raised a ticklish problem: if Congress counted Missouri's votes, that would count as recognition that Missouri was a state; on the other hand, if Congress failed to count Missouri's vote, it would count as recognition that Missouri was not a state. Knowing ahead of time that Monroe had won in a landslide and that Missouri's vote would therefore make no difference in the final result, the Senate passed a resolution on February 13, 1821 stating that if a protest were made, there would be no consideration of the matter unless the vote of Missouri would change who would become president. Instead, the President of the Senate would announce the final tally twice, once with Missouri included and once with it excluded.

The next day this resolution was introduced in the full House. After a lively debate, it was passed. Nonetheless, during the counting of the electoral votes on February 14, 1821, an objection was raised to the votes from Missouri by Representative Arthur Livermore of New Hampshire. He argued that since Missouri had not yet officially become a state, it had no right to cast any electoral votes. Immediately, Representative John Floyd of Virginia argued that Missouri's votes must be counted. Chaos ensued, and order was restored only with the counting of the vote as per the resolution and then adjournment for the day.

Results

Popular vote
The Federalists received a small amount of the popular vote despite having no electoral candidates. Even in Massachusetts, where the Federalist slate of electors was victorious, the electors cast all of their votes for Monroe. This was the first election in which the Democratic-Republicans won in Connecticut and Delaware.

Source (Electoral Vote): 

Source (Popular Vote): A New Nation Votes: American Election Returns 1787-1825

(a) Only 15 of the 24 states chose electors by popular vote.
(b) Adams received his vote from a faithless elector.
(c) There was a dispute as to whether Missouri's electoral votes were valid, due to the timing of its assumption of statehood. The first figure excludes Missouri's votes and the second figure includes them.

Electoral vote

The sole electoral vote against Monroe came from William Plumer, an elector from New Hampshire and former United States senator and New Hampshire governor. Plumer cast his electoral ballot for Secretary of State John Quincy Adams. Everett S. Brown, a political scientist, noted that Plumer had asked his son, William Plumer Jr., to see if Adams had objections to Plumer casting his vote for him. While legend has it this was to ensure that George Washington would remain the only American president unanimously chosen by the Electoral College, that was not Plumer's goal. In fact, Plumer simply thought that Monroe was a mediocre president and that Adams would be a better one. Plumer also refused to vote for Tompkins for Vice President as "grossly intemperate", not having "that weight of character which his office requires," and "because he grossly neglected his duty" in his "only" official role as President of the Senate by being "absent nearly three-fourths of the time"; Plumer ultimately voted for Adams for President and Richard Rush for Vice President. In response to Plumer's vote, Adams felt "surprise and mortification", and that Plumer's vote was an affront to the Monroe administration.

Even though every member of the Electoral College was pledged to Monroe, there were still a number of Federalist electors who voted for a Federalist vice president rather than Monroe's running mate Daniel D. Tompkins: those for Richard Stockton came from Massachusetts, while the entire Delaware delegation voted for Daniel Rodney for vice president, and Robert Goodloe Harper's vice presidential vote was cast by an elector from his home state of Maryland. In any case, these breaks in ranks were not enough to deny Tompkins a substantial electoral college victory.

Monroe's share of the electoral vote has not been exceeded by any candidate since, with the closest competition coming from Franklin D. Roosevelt's landslide 1936 victory.

Only Washington, who won the vote of each presidential elector in the 1789 and 1792 presidential elections, can claim to have swept the Electoral College. 

Source: 

(a) There was a dispute over the validity of Missouri's electoral votes, due to the timing of its assumption of statehood. The first figure excludes Missouri's votes and the second figure includes them.
(b) These votes are from electors who voted for a Federalist vice president rather than Monroe's running mate Daniel D. Tompkins; combined, these votes represent only 5.6% of the electoral vote.

Results by state 
Elections in this period were vastly different from modern day Presidential elections. The actual Presidential candidates were rarely mentioned on tickets and voters were voting for particular electors who were pledged to a particular candidate. There was sometimes confusion as to who the particular elector was actually pledged to. Results are reported as the highest result for an elector for any given candidate. For example, if three Monroe electors received 100, 50, and 25 votes, Monroe would be recorded as having 100 votes. Confusion surrounding the way results are reported may lead to discrepancies between the sum of all state results and national results.

In Massachusetts, Federalist electors won 62.06% of the vote. However, only 7,902 of these votes went to Federalist electors who did not cast their votes for Monroe (this being most likely because these Federalist electors lost). Similarly, In Kentucky, 1,941 ballots were cast for an elector labelled as Federalist who proceeded to vote for Monroe. All of the Federalist Monroe votes have been placed in the Federalist column, as the Federalist party fielded no presidential candidate and therefore it is likely these electors simply cast their votes for Monroe because the overwhelming majority he achieved made their votes irrelevant.

Electoral college selection

See also 
 History of the United States (1789–1849)
 One-party state
 Second inauguration of James Monroe
 1820–1821 United States House of Representatives elections
 1820–1821 United States Senate elections

Footnotes

References

Bibliography

External links 

 Presidential Elections of 1816 and 1820: A Resource Guide from the Library of Congress
 A New Nation Votes: American Election Returns, 1787-1825
 Election of 1820 in Counting the Votes 

 
Presidency of James Monroe
James Monroe
Uncontested elections